Rice production in Bangladesh is a crucial part of the national economy

The dominant food crop of Bangladesh is rice, accounting for about 75 percent of agricultural land use (and 28 percent of GDP).  Rice production increased every year in the 1980s (through 1987) except FY 1981, but the annual increases have generally been modest, barely keeping pace with the population. Rice production exceeded 15 million tons for the first time in FY 1986. In the mid-1980s, Bangladesh was the fourth largest rice producer in the world, but its productivity was low compared with other Asian countries, such as Malaysia and Indonesia.  It is currently the world's forth-largest producer. High-yield varieties of seed, application of fertilizer, and irrigation have increased yields, although these inputs also raise the cost of production and chiefly benefit the richer cultivators.

The cultivation of rice in Bangladesh varies according to seasonal changes in the water supply. The largest harvest is 'Aman', occurring in November and December and accounting for more than half of annual production. Some rice for the 'Aman' harvest is sown in the spring through the broadcast method, matures during the summer rains, and is harvested in the fall.  The higher yielding method involves starting the seeds in special beds and transplanting during the summer monsoon. The second harvest is aus, involving traditional strains but more often including high-yielding, dwarf varieties. Rice for the aus harvest is sown in March or April, benefits from April and May rains, matures during the summer rain, and is harvested during the summer. With the increasing use of irrigation, there has been a growing focus on another rice-growing season extending during the dry season from October to March. The production of this boro rice, including high-yield varieties, expanded rapidly until the mid-1980s, when production leveled off at just below 4 million tons.  Where irrigation is feasible, it is normal for fields throughout Bangladesh to produce rice for two harvests annually. Between rice-growing seasons, farmers will do everything possible to prevent the land from lying fallow and will grow vegetables, peanuts, pulses, or oilseeds if water and fertilizer are available.

Rice production in the country increased to 44 million tones in the fiscal year 2021-22 (FY22), which broke the previous records.

References

Agriculture in Bangladesh
Bangladesh